Warhammer 40,000: Dawn of War is a military science fiction real-time strategy video game developed by Relic Entertainment and based on Games Workshop's tabletop wargame Warhammer 40,000. It was released by THQ on September 20, 2004 in North America and on September 24 in Europe. Three expansion packs have been released: Winter Assault in 2005, Dark Crusade in 2006, and Soulstorm in 2008. Its first sequel, Dawn of War II was released in February 2009. Another sequel, Dawn of War III, was released in April 2017.

As a series, Warhammer 40,000: Dawn of War has sold more than 7 million copies worldwide as of January 2013.

Gameplay
Gameplay is initially focused on capturing and holding strategic locations on the battlefield. These control points are captured by infantry squads and provide resources to construct additional units and buildings or unlock certain units in an army's tech tree. Battles are won either by holding a certain number of control points for a period of time or by destroying all of the opposing armies' HQ structures. A number of special conditions are available to choose from to customize matches.

Factions

Warhammer 40,000: Dawn of War features four playable armies:

Space Marines are the elite, highly skilled and genetically modified superhuman soldiers of the Imperium. Inducted at a young age, each Space Marine receives biological modifications, a lifetime of rigorous training, and lives to experience centuries of endless battle in the defense of humanity. Space Marines have the highest morale in the game. Their troops and vehicles are more expensive, however, reflecting their limited numbers. The Space Marines are the only playable race in the single player section of the game, and the 11-mission campaign features the 3rd Company of the Blood Ravens chapter as the protagonists, led by Captain Gabriel Angelos and Librarian Isador Akios.
The Chaos Space Marines are traitors that, ten thousand years ago, chose to abandon their duties to humanity, betray the Immortal Emperor of Mankind and the Imperium, and instead worship the Gods of Chaos, accepting promises of power and immortality. In Dawn of War, they use troops that are corrupted mirrors of their loyal Imperial counterparts. In addition, they employ morale-draining daemons and psykers. The campaign features the Alpha Legion, with their leaders, Sindri Myr and Lord Bale.
The Eldar are a sophisticated psychic race, ancient and technologically advanced, that have fought the fell powers of Chaos for millions of years before mankind's birth. Eldar in Dawn of War are fast and agile but most of their units are more fragile. Swift both on foot and in their hovering grav-vehicles, they are also able to move quickly around the map via webway gates. The campaign features a warhost hailing from the craftworld Biel-Tan, led by Farseer Macha.
The Orks are a savage, brutal and warlike species who exist to seek the thrilling challenge of battle. While generally lacking in sophisticated technology, they are physically powerful, using brute force and crude weapons that well complement their tendency to attack in massive hordes. In large enough numbers, they gain morale immunity. The tech tree for Orks differs from the other races in that it depends on the amount of Orks currently in the army and the number of erected WAAAGH!! banners. Several clans are featured in the campaign, as is the hulking Ork Warboss, Orkamungus.

In addition to the four fully playable races, the Imperial Guard also make appearances in the single player campaign as allies of the Space Marines, led by Colonel Brom. Lacking the superhuman resilience and fighting prowess of the Space Marines, Imperial Guardsmen are forced to rely on numbers, ranged weaponry, and tanks. Limited numbers of Imperial Guard units can be controlled in the Space Marines campaign. They would later be made into the featured playable race in the first expansion pack, Winter Assault.

In the second expansion pack, Dark Crusade, there are two additional races to be played online and solo, Tau and Necrons. In order to play as Space Marines, Chaos, Eldar, Orks or Imperial Guard online, one must have the original Warhammer 40,000: Dawn of War game installed. The third and last expansion pack, Soulstorm, adds another two playable armies: Sisters of Battle and Dark Eldar. As with Dark Crusade, one must own the previous installments to play the other factions in multiplayer.

Resource management

Two primary resources exist: requisition and power. These resources are not harvested or otherwise gathered by the player's units. Instead, requisition is generated constantly by the army headquarters. The player can increase the rate at which requisition is acquired by using infantry squads to capture and control "Strategic Points", "Critical Locations" and "Relics" on the battlefield. These points, with the exception of the "Critical Location", can be reinforced with defensive structures called Listening Posts that also increase the rate of requisition accumulation. Though resources are unlimited, all sources of requisition will eventually decay, dramatically decreasing their supply rate.

Power is gathered by building generators, which also decay over time and consequently produce less power. Additionally, some maps have "slag deposits", upon which more powerful generators can be constructed to produce power faster. As the player progresses up the tech tree, reliance on power increases.

In addition to these primary resources, the Orks also have Ork resource. Ork resource is generated continuously by Waaagh! banners and is used up when creating Ork troops and vehicles. The number of banners and the size of the Ork population determines the Ork's Waaagh! level which in turn determines the technology level the player has access to.

Combat
Infantry units are not given orders as individuals; they move and attack as squads. Most fully reinforced squads consist of about eight individuals, although when they are first requisitioned, they usually have fewer. They can usually be equipped with special weapons and a specific leader, depending on the squad type. Squads can produce and replace their own units and weaponry anywhere in the field, but the player must wait a short period of time before new individuals, weapons, and leaders appear in the squad. Additionally, all races have commander units, which are general leaders or other units that can be attached to most squads, but are produced separately.

Infantry units can fight in both ranged and hand-to-hand combat, and many units will have weapons for both types of combat, and if attacked in close combat will have to respond accordingly. Hand-to-hand combat is played out as a series of synchronized attack animations between combatants. When one combatant defeats the other, a finishing move known as "Sync Kill" plays out as the victorious fighter finishes his opponent off in a dramatic and violent manner. More powerful units, such as Heroes, Walkers, and monstrous Super Units, may have personalized Sync Kills against each other.

Vehicles are highly resistant to most standard infantry weaponry, so they must be targeted with specific heavy weapons (e.g. anti-tank rockets) to be destroyed. Vehicles can also be upgraded with multiple weapon systems, usually forcing a choice between either anti-infantry or anti-vehicle armaments. Walkers are a type of vehicle often armed with powerful heavy melee weapons, causing devastating damage in close combat.

In addition to a typical hitpoint system, infantry units also have morale. When in combat, squads take morale damage as well as health damage. However, morale applies to a squad as a whole. In addition to health, the morale of a squad heavily influences its combat ability. When morale drops to zero, the squad "breaks", which significantly reduces the squad's ranged accuracy, damage dealt in mêlée, and defensive capability. The squad's movement speed, however, is slightly increased to allow it to retreat. That said, the unit must still be ordered away from the combat for it to escape. The squad's morale will regenerate on its own while the squad is not in combat, and the squad will "regroup" and regain combat effectiveness once it reaches a certain threshold.

Just as with hitpoints, different types of units have different amounts of morale. Commanders have the most morale, and basic infantry usually have the least. Attaching (when possible) a commander unit to basic squads significantly increases their morale. Some weapon types, such as flamethrowers, sniper rifles and artillery bombardment, are especially effective at demoralizing the enemy. Favorable terrain such as craters, ruins or thick jungle give units a defensive cover bonus against both hitpoint and morale damage, while water and swamps will decrease their defensive ability.

Units
The number of units a player may field at one time is determined by population and vehicle 'squad caps'; these limit the number of infantry troops and vehicles a player may have on the battlefield. Squad caps may be increased using methods differing between races. Most units have a melee attack and a ranged attack. Units are often specialized to be better using one attack type. Certain units are "hard capped", meaning a player may only have a certain amount of them, such as Skull probes and Apothecaries (both of the Space marine faction) being limited to 4, and commanders and ultimate units being limited to 1. All units also have stances; these affect how the units respond to enemies. There are three types of units: commanders, infantry, and vehicles.

Commanders are hero units, and each commander can only be fielded one at a time. If they perish, they may be rebuilt. A sub-class is the semi-commander unit, which has many abilities like the commander unit but several may be fielded at once. Infantry are foot soldiers, and may either be regular or heavy, with heavy infantry being much tougher than normal infantry. Vehicles serve as heavy weapon platforms and/or transports, and include tanks, artillery, troop carriers and walkers.

Infantry come in squads that are commanded as a single entity. They may be reinforced with additional members, equipped with special weapons, or be attached to hero units. Some squads have special abilities, such as grenades, teleportation, and stealth, unlocked with research or leader units. Unit longevity is determined by their health and morale points, which govern a squad's fighting effectiveness. Both are reduced by weaponry; morale recharges independently or due to unit abilities, while health is increased by natural regeneration, healer units, or repair.

Each of the four races has access to a unique special unit whilst in control of a ‘relic’, they are superior to normal units. To obtain one of the special units the player must complete all pre-requisites (research, own specific buildings) and be in the final tier of research. These special units also require substantially more resources and time to create.

Buildings
Aside from their initial headquarters, races may build research and resource centers, unit-producing facilities, and defensive fortifications. Research buildings may research special upgrades that increase the abilities of that race's units, while resource buildings produce resources. Unit facilities produce infantry and vehicles. In order to access their next tier, a race must build certain buildings to unlock new technologies and buildings.

Plot

Setting

The game is set in the Warhammer 40,000 universe: a dystopian vision of the far future in which humanity has forged a galaxy-spanning empire, The Imperium of Man. The Imperium, desperately fighting to preserve the human race from extinction, is in a state of constant war with alien species like the Orks or Eldar, as well as insurrections from renegade worlds or the human servants of Chaos, who employ demonic forces and sorcery under either of the Chaos Gods they serve, having deliberately betrayed their once godlike Emperor of Man.

The single player campaign is set on the planet Tartarus, an Imperial colony under siege by Ork invaders, with the player taking the role of the Space Marines' Blood Ravens 3rd Company, led by Captain Gabriel Angelos, that arrives to assist the planet's 37th Tartarus Planetary Defence Force Regiment of the Imperial Guard, led by Colonel Carus Brom. The story of this campaign also sets the stage for the events of Dawn of War II - Retribution.

Story

The Blood Ravens' Space Marines, upon descent to the planet's surface, secure Tartarus' spaceport and start their own operations against the warring Orkish forces. These include key tasks such as the elimination of their leaders (including an Ork Warboss) to destabilize the Orks' fighting spirit. Unknown to the Space Marines, however, the Orks' invasion was in fact engineered by the Chaos Alpha Legion's Sorcerer, Sindri Myr, as a smokescreen to their operations on Tartarus, using the forces of Sindri's supposed commander, Lord Bale. However, during the confrontation with the Warboss, the shuttle which ferries Sindri and Bale away is spotted by a Blood Ravens' scout.

Hearing this, Angelos is set to investigate, but is interrupted by the sudden arrival of Mordecai Toth of the Inquisition, who attempts to order the Blood Ravens to evacuate Tartarus (due to an upcoming Warp Storm that will soon engulf the planet in Chaos energy and prevent warp travel and escape).  Angelos allows Toth use of Space Marine transports to assist in the evacuation but desires to remain and investigate, clashing with Toth's resolution, who cites that Angelos' previous request of an Exterminatus (a space-based planetary bombardment) on his once homeworld of Cyrene, years ago, may have affected his judgement, "seeing Chaos where it doesn't exist". 

During Angelos' obstinate pursuit, he uncovers the presence of Eldar forces from the Biel-Tan Craftworld, under Farseer Macha, covertly operating on Tartarus and coming across Chaos 'markers' (Sacrificial sites which show the way to a specific location) that Angelos orders his long-friend and Librarian, Isador Akios, to document and then destroy. The Librarian, however, secretly harbours Chaos artifacts and he damages the Blood Ravens' transports to allow further research time, being influenced constantly by Sindri's temptations.

Angelos' forces track the Eldar to the urban settlement of Loovre Marr, engaging them in full-scale battle, as Sindri and the Alpha Legion infiltrate the city and abscond with an artifact, which Macha believes is the "key to the undoing of this world". Witnessing the events too late, Angelos presses Macha for more information, but instead, the Eldar leader implicates Toth's involvement in the matter, citing his obstinance in withholding information and using the matter of the upcoming Warp Storm to avoid involving any other interested party in the conflict. Angelos clashes again with Toth, who assumes command of all of the planet's Imperial assets, except the Blood Ravens and 37th Tartarus Planetary Defence Force, after learning Angelos employed Colonel Brom's Imperial Guard to assist him. Toth claims that Angelos' stubbornness to leave the planet may be a sign of Chaos corruption.

On a hint given by Macha, whose forces are severely weakened due to the battle of Loovre Marr, the Blood Ravens track down the Alpha Legion to the ruins of an Imperial Temple where they are stalled by traitorous Imperial Guard regiments, corrupted by Chaos, giving time for Sindri and Bale to evade pursuit once again. After the battle, Angelos confronts Toth when he arrives at the scene, with Toth revealing the planet bears an ancient Chaos artifact called the Maledictum, a stone which contains the essence of a daemon, capable of influencing human minds to perform its bidding, while summoning Warp Storms to imprison any that attempt to escape. Toth explains that the Eldar presence on Tartarus was to prevent the Alpha Legion from unearthing the stone, unwilling to inform or cooperate with Imperial forces due to arrogant behaviour, seeing themselves as "the only capable defence against its influence".

Angelos and Toth make amends and advance against the primary position of the Alpha Legion, as it is performing an unholy ritual to unearth the Maledictum. However, while the Blood Ravens and the remaining loyal Imperial Guard exterminate Lord Bale's forces, the same abandoned by Sindri to die to unearth the artifact, Isador takes the Maledictum and departs with Sindri, revealing that he had been overcome by the temptations of Chaos. Angelos and Toth pursue  but only reach him after he has been subdued by Sindri who takes the Maledictum. Toth reveals that he suspected corruption from within the Blood Ravens, but made a mistake in focusing more on Angelos than Isador because of Angelos' obstinacy and dark past, citing it took either "steel or rot" to plead the Inquisition to exterminate the whole population of Angelos' former home. As the Blood Ravens destroy Isador's Chaos forces, Angelos fights Isador in a hand-to-hand duel. Despite Isador's taunts of Gabriel's supposed weakness and guilt for the events of Cyrene, Gabriel overcomes them, citing "innocents must die so that humanity may live", implying that the planet was long corrupted by Chaos and there was no salvation but by destruction. Defeating Isador, Angelos executes him even as the Librarian tries pleading for forgiveness.

Angelos and Toth chase Sindri to a ritual site, as the Warp Storm approaches, but fail to apprehend him before he performs a ritual with the Maledictum to sacrifice himself in order to summon a Daemon Prince. As Toth bequeaths his Daemon Hammer, "God-Splitter", to Angelos, the Blood Ravens, assisted by the Eldar survivors, fight and overcome the remaining Alpha Legion in a violent battle, overcoming the Daemon Prince despite its power. In the aftermath, Toth orders Angelos to destroy the Maledictum, while Macha pleads him to stay his hammer.  Angelos, however, quickly destroys it. As all parties start to evacuate, Angelos is called back and faces the daemon that he has unkowingly freed from its prison, the Maledictum. The daemon reveals that all of Tartarus was actually a sacrificial altar to the Chaos God Khorne (the Blood God) and that every death in the confrontation, including the Ork invasion which was arranged by Sindri, were offerings to empower the stone to allow the Daemon's release. It is implied that had the Blood Ravens realised this and destroyed the Maledictum earlier, the daemon would likely have been destroyed as well.

The daemon allows Angelos and the Blood Ravens to leave, though with a message that he soon would be coming for them all. Gabriel vows to destroy the daemon, stating "I know you now", before finally departing Tartarus.

Release
The base game has three expansions, all available in DVD format and on Steam. Each expansion adds substantial additional new content to the game, such as new factions, maps and units. For the latter standalone expansions, users are unable to play any factions in multiplayer other than those added by the expansion itself.

In chronological order of release, these expansions are:

Winter Assault
Dark Crusade
Soulstorm

Cumulatively, the expansions add five new factions to the game's pre-existing selection of four, making for a total of nine factions to choose from, along with adding dozens of new maps, tweaks, etc.

The Game of the Year edition was released on September 21, 2005 in the US and on September 23 in Europe, containing 4 exclusive maps. Later, the Game of the Year edition and Winter Assault were bundled in the Gold Edition in the US, released in March 2006. In November 2006, Dawn of War and its first two expansions were released together as The Platinum Collection in the USA or as the Dawn of War Anthology in the PAL regions. More recently, in March 2008, all three expansions along with Dawn of War have been released as The Complete Collection. 

In addition, a series of three novels was released by Black Library and later released as a single omnibus volume.

Reception

By early 2009, Dawn of War and its expansion packs together had sold 4 million copies. Dawn of War received a "Silver" sales award from the Entertainment and Leisure Software Publishers Association (ELSPA), indicating sales of at least 100,000 copies in the United Kingdom.

Upon release, the critical response to Warhammer 40,000: Dawn of War was on the whole positive. It was congratulated most frequently for its varied and balanced factions and units, its polished presentation, in particular the high quality of unit animations, and the user interface.

One of the first reviews was by IGN, who awarded the game 8.8/10, in particular praising the large level of graphical and animation detail. They also cited the skirmish and multiplayer as one of the game's strongest points. GameSpot came to similar conclusions, in particular praising the game's presentation and audio.

Conversely, an area of the game that drew criticism was the single player campaign, which many reviewers found to be too short and unchallenging. Another area of weakness identified was a lack of originality in the gameplay. However, these weaknesses were considered to be minor, IGN summarising "Nothing about the gameplay will really surprise anyone (though the addition of reinforceable squads is pretty neat) but it doesn't particularly matter ... Relic kicked ass creating a great piece of entertainment." The French website Jeux PC awarded the game 16 out of 20, in particular praising the simplicity of the user interface and the intensity of the battles. German reviewer Daniel Matschijewsky awarded the game 83 out of 100, praising the user interface and the sound, but identifying the campaign and the AI as weaker areas.

Dawn of War was a runner-up for Computer Games Magazines list of the 10 best computer games of 2004. It received a runner-up position in GameSpots 2004 "Best Strategy Game" award category across all platforms, losing to Rome: Total War.

Notes

References

Further reading
 
The same information can be found in

External links

2004 video games
Lua (programming language)-scripted video games
Multiplayer and single-player video games
Real-time strategy video games
Relic Entertainment games
Sega Games franchises
Science fiction video games
THQ games
Video games scored by Jeremy Soule
Video games developed in Canada
Video games set on fictional planets
Video games with expansion packs
D
Windows-only games
Windows games
Video games about demons